Emma Rebecca McGann (born 29 May 1990) is a British singer-songwriter, musician, and online live-streamer on broadcasting platforms YouNow and Twitch.

Early life
McGann was born in 1990 in the Midlands, England.

Education
She attended Cardinal Wiseman Catholic School and pursued further education in music at Coventry University graduating in 2012 with a degree in Music Composition and Professional Practice.

Music career
Her first album was Start the Show (2010).

In 2014, McGann released "Cherry On Top" which received airplay on BBC Radio 1 in January 2015.

McGann is an online live-streamer on broadcasting platform YouNow (previously BlogTV) and makes a living from performing live-streamed gigs from a home studio.

She premiered a track in 2015 called "Me and YouNow" through the site followed by a music video.

On 24 November 2017, McGann released the double disc album B.R.A.V.E.. It includes songs like "Second Chances", "Forest Fire" and more.

Awards and nominations
She was nominated in the iHeartRadio Music Awards 2017 Social Star Award Category.

McGann was nominated and shortlisted as a finalist in the Shorty Awards 2016 in the YouNower of the Year Category.

She was shortlisted as a runner-up for funding in the PRS for Music Foundation's Lynsey de Paul Prize 2015.

McGann accepted a music award in 2010 (a StudyVox FM Music Award) presented by Kylie Minogue for her single "Fall Into Me".

References

1990 births
Living people
British women singer-songwriters
21st-century British women singers
Musicians from Coventry
Alumni of Coventry University